Giacomo Ricci (born 30 March 1985 in Baveno) is an Italian racing driver.

Career

Formula BMW
Ricci began his car racing career by driving in the German-based Formula BMW ADAC series in 2001 and 2002, with a best finish of seventh in the drivers' championship.

Formula Renault
Ricci also competed in one race of the Italian Formula Renault Championship in 2001, and competed in rounds of the two-litre German series and the European Cup in 2002. For 2003 he made a step down to the smaller engine category of the Spanish Formula Junior 1600 series, finishing fourth in the championship. He also drove in one race of the North American-based FRenault series during the year. In 2004 he drove in eight races of the World Series by Nissan (who share the same owners as Renault, the championship being rebranded as the World Series by Renault the following year).

Formula 3000
From 2004 to 2007, Ricci drove in the F3000 series variously known as Euro Formula 3000, Italian Formula 3000 and the Euroseries 3000. After initially scoring no points from four races in 2004, he improved to third place in the standings in 2005. In 2006, driving for the Fisichella Motorsport team, he won the championship with five wins and thirteen podium finishes. For 2007 he only competed in selected rounds and finished fifth in the championship, opting to focus his intentions on North American-based motor racing that year.

Champ Car Atlantic
Ricci duly drove in Champ Car Atlantic (the feeder series for the now-defunct Champ Car World Series) in 2007 for the Conquest Racing team. He finished in sixth place in the championship, despite not scoring any wins or podium finishes. He was the third-highest ranked rookie of 2007, behind Franck Perera and Robert Wickens.

GP2 Series
Ricci received his GP2 Series call-up in 2008 to replace the injured Michael Herck in the David Price Racing team for the first few rounds of the championship, because the Belgian-Romanian driver had broken his wrist in the preceding GP2 Asia Series. His team-mate was Brazilian Diego Nunes. He was replaced by Andy Soucek after the first two rounds of the championship as Herck continued to recover.

Ricci then competed in the first round of the 2008–09 GP2 Asia Series season for the Trident Racing team. He was then replaced by Alberto Valerio, so he moved back to DPR for the second round onwards, where he in turn replaced Yuhi Sekiguchi.

Ricci continued with DPR into the 2009 GP2 Series season, teaming up with Herck this time, as he did in the Asia Series. Ricci struggled with reliability, finishing only three of the seven races he started and was replaced for the Nürburgring rounds by ex-IndyCar Series racer Franck Perera.

Ricci returned for the 2009–10 GP2 Asia Series season and after a double retirement at the first Abu Dhabi round, Ricci scored his first ever GP2 points in either the main series or the Asia Series, after finishing fifth in the second Abu Dhabi feature race. He added his first podium the following day, finishing third behind team-mate Herck and race-winner Davide Valsecchi during the sprint race. His first victory came in the final race of the season, leading from lights-to-flag in Bahrain. With this result, he sealed third place in the championship both for himself, and his team.

Ricci remained with DPR for the 2010 main series, and scored his first points finish with second place in the first race of the season. He then endured an eleven-race, non-scoring streak, but a stronger weekend in Hungary culminated in his maiden main series win in the sprint race. However, he was replaced by compatriot Fabrizio Crestani thereafter. He still finished in thirteenth place in the drivers' championship despite missing the final six races on the calendar.

After spending most of 2011 without a drive, Ricci returned to the GP2 Series for the non-championship races in Abu Dhabi that concluded the season. Driving for Super Nova Racing alongside compatriot Fabio Onidi, he finished 11th and 23rd in the two races.

International GT Open
Ricci also competed in the GTA and GTS classes of the International GT Open championship in 2008.

Auto GP
The withdrawal of the Super Nova team from the GP2 Series hampered Ricci's hopes to remain in the category, so for 2012 he returned to the Euroseries 3000 (now rebranded as the Auto GP) to compete in selected events for the Austrian Zele Racing team.

He is currently the team manager of Trident Racing.

Racing record

Career summary

‡ Team standings.

Complete Euroseries 3000/Auto GP results
(key) (Races in bold indicate pole position) (Races in italics indicate fastest lap)

Complete GP2 Series results
(key) (Races in bold indicate pole position) (Races in italics indicate fastest lap)

Complete GP2 Asia Series results
(key) (Races in bold indicate pole position) (Races in italics indicate fastest lap)

Complete GP2 Final results
(key) (Races in bold indicate pole position) (Races in italics indicate fastest lap)

References
Career statistics from driverdb.com.  Retrieved on May 9, 2008.

External links
 
 

1985 births
Living people
Racing drivers from Milan
Italian racing drivers
Italian Formula Renault 2.0 drivers
Formula BMW ADAC drivers
Formula Renault Eurocup drivers
German Formula Renault 2.0 drivers
North American Formula Renault drivers
Atlantic Championship drivers
International Formula Master drivers
Auto GP drivers
International GT Open drivers
Italian Formula Three Championship drivers
GP2 Asia Series drivers
GP2 Series drivers
European Le Mans Series drivers
Team Astromega drivers
Scuderia Coloni drivers
Conquest Racing drivers
David Price Racing drivers
BVM Target drivers
Euronova Racing drivers
Trident Racing drivers
RP Motorsport drivers
Super Nova Racing drivers
AF Corse drivers